Marshrutka or marshrutnoe taksi  (Russian and Ukrainian: маршру́тка , from marshrutn[oy]e taksi) or routed taxicab, are share taxis found in Eastern Europe and the republics of the former Soviet Union. Usually vans, they drive along set routes, depart only when all seats are filled, and may have higher fares than buses. Passengers can board a marshrutka anywhere along its route if there are seats available.

Fares are usually paid before the marshrutka leaves; riders nearer the driver are responsible for handing up the other passengers' fares and passing back change.

Etymology
The Russian word маршрутка is the colloquial form for маршрутное такси, which literally means "routed taxi" (маршрут referring to a planned route that something follows, and такси meaning "taxi"). The word маршрут is from the German word Marschroute, which is composed of the words Marsch ("a walk, march") and Route ("route").

History

Early days (pre-1992)
"Route taxicabs" were introduced in Moscow for the first time in the USSR in 1938, operated with ZiS-101 limousines. They offered ordinary people a chance to ride in luxurious ZiS cars, otherwise reserved for high officials. At first, they were meant mainly for tourists and serviced mainly stations and airports.

Unlike ordinary taxicabs using taximeters, routed taxicab rides are charged by zones, like trams, buses , and trolley buses. The fares ranked cheaper than those of ordinary taxis but higher than those of large-scale public transport. Unlike ordinary taxis, where a passenger could enjoy a private ride, the routed taxicab would pick up and drop passengers along its route. During communist rule, state-owned taxicab parks operated all marshrutkas.

Other large Soviet cities (apart from Moscow) organized routed taxis. For example, Gorky had a routed taxi line between Sormovo and the Nizhny Novgorod Kremlin. , the full fare was Rbls 3.50; a similar service cost 1 rouble by bus or 50 kopecks by tram.

During the World War II of 1941–1945, as the Red Army requisitioned cars, routed taxi services ceased. They resumed in Moscow in 1945. Only by the 1950s did they re-appear in most cities where they had operated before the war. ZiS-110 and GAZ-12 ZIM cars served widely in this role until the mid-1960s.

Routed taxicabs also offered interurban services. From Moscow, they drove to distant cities, like Simferopol, Kharkiv, Vladimir, Tula, and Riazan. For example, the Moscow-Yalta route operated in the summer, taking two days, with a night stop in Belgorod (near Kursk).

In the 1960s, RAF-977 minibusses became the most common routed-taxi vehicles, replacing passenger cars. Municipal authorities operated the routes; thus, the quality and concept varied greatly between regions. The fare gap between buses and routed taxicabs lessened. In Moscow, for example, the standard bus fare cost 5 kopecks, and the minibus fare was 15 kopecks on most routes; in Gorky a regular bus-ride cost 6 kopecks, and a routed-taxi ride 10 kopecks.

Later, the new model RAF-2203 Latvija (introduced in 1976) replaced the RAF-977 minibusses. Eventually, practically all marshrutka services used RAF-2203 Latvijas; many people referred to marshrutkas as "Latvias" or "RAFicks".

Marshrutka boom (1992–2000)
The introduction of market economies greatly changed the supply of transportation to the urban population in the CIS. The demand for faster and more versatile public transit came to be fulfilled dramatically, while the demand for the underfunded municipal transportation system dropped; people were willing to pay a premium for better service. Although buses (like Ikarus, LAZ, PAZ, RAF, and KAvZ, as well as irregularly imported used minibusses), obtained on a secondary market, had been used by entrepreneurs as a backup on the busiest routes since the early 1990s, it wasn't until the auto manufacturer GAZ rolled out in 1996 the first mass-produced Russian minibus, GAZelle, that the modern system took shape.

GAZelle was an instant hit as it was a cheap (around US$8,000), easy-to-repair, and lease-friendly passenger minibus with a capacity of twelve seated passengers. A lot of individual entrepreneurs entered the market, as well as some larger companies. At this time, licensing for public transportation in particular was not required. The vehicle only had to pass annual safety check-ups, which were relatively easy, since local authorities trusted GAZ cars. Moreover, the GAZelle could be easily equipped to run on natural gas.

During this period, most marshrutkas followed well-established public transit routes.

Modern days (2000–present)
Witnessing the success of privately owned public transportation led to some reaction from the society. Local authorities responded by toughening safety and licensing requirements—like mandatory free transportation of a certain number of disabled passengers upon request and "package deals" in route licensing—tying the privilege to drive on a lucrative route to the chore of driving several not-so-profitable ones. The market became dominated either by large companies or by unions of owner-operators of individual minibuses. Some of municipal public transportation companies entered the business, and prices dropped due to increased competition.

Another consequence was a massive response from car and bus manufacturers. Old manufacturers introduced smaller, more maneuverable models (like PAZ or KAZ) and started licensed assembly of minibuses (KrAZ started assembling Iveco minibuses). Diesel models in the form of the new Isuzu Bogdan, Tata Etalon and others have seen immense popularity. The capacity grew from fifteen sitting passengers to jam-packed small buses of fifty. The busiest routes in major cities now use full-size privately owned buses operating at the same price with municipal companies. The original GAZelle saw a few official modifications to its body, length and passenger capacity to better serve buyer demands, including models featuring diesel engines.

Russia, Ukraine, Belarus and Moldova

Russia

In Russia, GAZelle, Mercedes-Benz Sprinter, Peugeot Boxer, Fiat Ducato, Renault Master, Volkswagen Crafter, Iveco Daily and Ford Transit vans are usually used as route taxis, although in eastern parts the Japanese minibuses like Toyota Hiace are more popular. Often they (except GAZelle and Japanese vans) are refurbished from vans to special enterprises (such as ST Nizhegorodets, PKF Luidor, Promteh-NN and others) by cutting windows, inserting the glass, installing seats, automatic sliding doors, trim and handrails (are licensed manufacturers of vans for a given activity and are sold through the official dealer network). Route taxis congregate at train stations, metro stations, and transfer points at the end of tram and trolley bus routes. Minibuses are also used, such as PAZ-3205 (in small towns), PAZ-3204, Bogdan, Hyundai County, as well as small buses from China.

In St. Petersburg the route is identified as "Kxxx" with "xxx" being the number of the bus, tram and trolley bus routes being followed and "K" standing for the Russian word for "commercial" (коммерческий, kommerchesky). There are routes traveled solely by route taxis — cross-city routes connecting termini of the metro. Usually, the route taxi will not depart the start point of a route until all seats are occupied.

In the Gazelle no standing places due to a lack of height, and filled the cabin, they do not stop at the request of people standing at the bus stop, and stop when the one or more seats become vacant (the driver monitors the filling and turns away extra passengers at the entrance), and in all other shuttles stand-up and they stay there, regardless of occupancy. The taxi will skip stops if they are not requested and (if operated with a GAZelle or similar) by-pass hailing riders until it has empty seats. The fare is commonly one and a half or twice the fare of a regular bus.

The appeal for the route taxi passenger is officially considered to be a faster ride in less-crowded conditions than regular transport; the taxi routes that follow cross-city routes are most often the fastest. However, collapse of municipal transport services in many cities makes it absolutely impractical to commute without the help of marshrutkas at all.

In St. Petersburg average marshrutka fare is 35 roubles (€0.70) per person, with intercity bus fares reaching Rbls 70 (€1.40). In other cities (e.g., Novosibirsk) it can be as low as Rbls 20 (€0.40) per person. Passengers either pay with cash or transportation cards (e-wallet).

In 2016 Moscow has banned marshrutkas and integrated private buses into the city transport network. Private buses now operate on set routes and accept regular tickets. However, marshrutkas with routes leading to or originating from Moscow Oblast are allowed to operate in the city and in 2019 are still common in the districts bordering Moscow Oblast such as Vykhino-Zhulebino, Novokosino or Levoberezhny.

It is relatively cheap and fast to ride a marshrutka. The only drawback foreigners have noticed is the poor noise insulation, which makes it so that you have to practically scream at the driver to request a stop.  Mini marshrutkas were built in Russia in 2019.

Ukraine

In Ukraine, the Bogdan A091 and A092 buses are the most common route taxi which can be found operating in towns and cities. Generally the fare is higher than city owned public buses. Alighting the bus is possible regardless of the designated bus stop, but generally this is up to driver's discretion. State Automobile inspection (ДАІ) forbids picking up passengers outside of the bus stops. Marshrutkas do not require tickets, although a passenger can ask for a ticket when paying the fare as a receipt for expense claim purposes.

Etalons and Bogdans usually have a conductor on board selling the tickets. In the GAZelle or converted van, the fare is paid directly to the driver, either upon pickup or departure of the passenger. It is common etiquette for passengers to relay the fare of fellow passengers to the driver, and the change back on crowded buses.

"Everybody pays" fast buses

In Kyiv, Ukraine and other cities, marshrutkas evolved into "everybody pays" fast buses. The public route microbuses can be small, medium-size, and sometimes big buses, with a higher fare than on ordinary municipally funded buses. They also do not take month subscription tickets. Marshrutkas do not carry pensioners. Depending on the city, persons with disabilities, students, law enforcement workers, and civil servants (pass holders) ride for free.   Marshrutkas will not take more free passengers (e.g. disabled) than the strictly limited quantity of one per vehicle, while in ordinary buses, trolleybuses and trams the number is not limited and more categories of people (pensioners, etc.) have the right to ride for free. This is why there are many times more marshrutkas in the city than ordinary buses, trolleybuses and trams altogether.

Since municipally funded buses must transport pass holders for free, pass holders prefer using municipal buses to private buses. The lack of marshrutkas' free-ride obligations is because they are classed as "taxis." Ordinary municipal buses, which are usually "full of free riders", are as a result unprofitable and cause economic loss. If a marshrutka charges the same fare as a municipal bus, the marshrutka will profit more, since there is an effective doubling of the profit due to there being one or no free pass riders on board.

Marshrutka usually operate faster and with greater frequency than ordinary buses. Stopping marshrutka in the city, at established stops, comes out of practice, being difficult because of the large number of passengers and the high frequency of the stops.

In the 1990s when local authorities temporarily lost their ability to finance city bus work, the bus drivers installed tablets with the inscription "Taxomotor" in their bus windows. That meant that every passenger had to pay the fare.

Belarus
In Minsk, Belarus, the fleet of vehicles is the same as Russia, consisting of Mercedes-Benz Sprinter and Ford Transit.

Moldova
In Moldova, rutierele run all over the capital and to most large cities in the country. Most rutierele are white and have only the roof vent and front windows for airflow. Rutierele will usually seat around 16 people with space for another 15 to 20 to stand while holding railing.

The South Caucasus states

Armenia
In Yerevan, Armenia, marshrutkas ( maršrutka or երթուղային տաքսի ert’uġayin tak'si) cost the same as larger buses (100 AMD in 2018), with the fare being paid when the passenger exits. There are no tickets issued. Marshrutkas can be hailed anywhere along their route, though they do have specific stops and riders can exit at any point if the driver is willing to pull over. While the law requires that marshrutkas stop only at designated stops while on major streets, compliance with this law depends on the driver and the degree of police enforcement at any given time.

Marshrutkas are the primary form of vehicular intercity transit in Armenia (outside of the Ararat Valley, where some full-sized bus lines operate). For example, as of January 2016, there is an hourly route between Yerevan and Ijevan — an approximately two-hour trip — costing 1500 AMD. From most bus stations in Armenia, it is possible to find marshrutka routes connecting to several nearby small or mid-size cities.

Georgia

In Tbilisi, Georgia, marshrutkas ("მარშრუტკა" marshrutka; officially, "სამარშრუტო ტაქსი", samarshruto taksi, "route taxi") vary in cost from 50 tetri to 1 lari. Up until 2011, all marshrutkas in Tbilisi had a common fare of 50 tetri. However, after introducing new Ford Transit minibus vehicles, the price went up and is now at 1 lari. Marshrutkas stop upon passengers' request. There are no specific stops. In most Marshrutkas, the driver is paid in cash, but all cabs can accept payments from Tbilisi Metroman card (pre-loaded city transportation card).

The Baltic states

Latvia
Historically, marshrutkas ("mikroautobuss" in Latvian) were a common means of transport in larger cities of the Latvian SSR, the RAF-2203 was the only minibus used for this purpose.

In today's Latvia, marshrutkas are no longer in service in most cities, including Riga. Minibuses with a fixed schedule and fixed bus stops have taken over as the prevailing means of transport in places where marshrutkas once dominated.

Lithuania
In Lithuania, marshrutkas had been in service in a variety of cities since the end of the 1980s – mostly in Vilnius and Kaunas, but also in Klaipėda, Šiauliai and elsewhere. They were mainly used as public transportation in city limits but sometimes their routes extended outside the city limits. Marshrutkas were widely used, with travelers themselves explaining that the marshrutkas are a much faster way of public transportation than buses or trolleybuses.

Estonia

In Estonia, marshrutkas ("Marsruuttakso" in Estonian) are used in Tallinn. They are mostly used on routes connecting the city to small towns nearby, such as Saku, Saue and Kose where most people have cars and demand for public transport is lower but the many departure times are still useful. Late evening departures may have higher fares because local trains and other alternative means of transportation are not running. In late evening marshrutkas are also a good choice for suburbs where bus services end around midnight, but some marshrutkas continue to run.

Central Asia

In Central Asia (at least in Uzbekistan, Kazakhstan , and Kyrgyzstan), standing room is allowed on marshrutkas. Indeed, drivers will often encourage passengers to board the marshrutka and cram together until there is not enough space for another passenger to board. In such a case, once a passenger exits the marshrutka, the driver will stop for others and allow them on until it is full again. Marshrutkas may be boarded at bus stops, but will usually stop at other places if hailed, and often won't stop at bus stops unless a passenger requests an exit or a prospective passenger hails the marshrutka.

Passengers may request to exit at any point but may have to wait until the driver deems that it is convenient to stop.

The typical Central Asian marshrutka is usually a white minibus branded "Mercedes", though may come in any number of colours, sometimes used to distinguish a specific route. The models most commonly used have a vent in the roof that may be opened by passengers if the atmosphere inside becomes too stuffy. Though not the norm, other vehicles are used as well.

The normal price per fare in Bishkek is 15 som and there are no transfers. From Manas International Airport to Osh bazaar in Bishkek is 40 som. In Almaty, on 3 January 2008, bus fare was increased from 40 tenges to 60 tenges (about 40 cents). Prices range throughout Central Asia, dependent on whether it is a city or village, the local cost of living, the distance covered by route, and government policy.

Outside ex-Soviet countries

Finland
There is no domestic marshrutka tradition in Finland as the country was never a part of the Soviet Union. Public transport has been tightly controlled using licensing for taxis and hereditary route concessions or a complete takeover by city transport authorities for bus traffic since the 1930s leaving no possibilities for marshrutka-type services.

As the regulation applies only to domestic transportation, there are marshrutkas operating in Finland. In international transportation, Russian marshrutkas have been operating since the breakup of the Soviet Union between Helsinki and St Petersburg. They can be boarded only for trips crossing the Finnish-Russian border. Marshrutkas are the cheapest way of traveling between Helsinki and St Petersburg.

Israel

In  Sherut, pl.  moniyot sherut is a word meaning "service". Referring to vans or minibuses that serve as share taxis in Israel, these can be picked up from anywhere on their route. They follow fixed routes (sometimes the same routes as public transport buses) and usually leave from the initial station only when full. Moniyot sherut operate both inter and intra-city. Payment is often done by passing money to the driver in a "human chain" formed by the passengers seated before. The change (and the receipt, when requested) are returned to the person who paid by the same means. In intra-city routes, where they compete with official buses, the drivers usually coordinate their travel by radio so that they can arrive at the bus station just before public transport buses and take the most passengers. Unlike most of the Israeli public transport network, the sherut services also operate on Shabbat.

South-eastern Europe

Bulgaria

Bulgarian marshrutkas are customized passenger vans. They have been modified to include large windows in the back, rails and handles.
In some cases, seating has been modified — popular routes carrying more passengers typically have more standing space.

Sofia's marshrutka system is considerably developed and has existed since the late 1980s, offering many routes crossing through the city centre, communicating with outer suburbs and nearby villages. The Sofia fleet includes such models as the Peugeot Boxer, Citroën Jumper, Ford Transit, Iveco Daily and Renault Master. Other cities have adopted a similar system and models available vary from city to city.

Similar to public transport, they operate along numbered routes around the city and have a fixed fare (1.50 leva in Sofia, equivalent to €0.75 as of 2014); the fare is paid upon getting in. Marshrutkas are not obliged to stop anywhere on the route, although there are popular spots where they do slow down. Marshrutka drivers are asked to stop and pick one up in a taxi-like manner; the getting-off is arranged with the driver, often by just standing up and approaching the door. Sometimes the driver will ask for consent to veer off the charted path to avoid a traffic jam or roadworks.

Marshrutkas are commonly white, although their colour can vary, and they are often partially covered in advertising. There are about 50 marshrutka lines in Sofia alone; the lines being operated by separate private companies. About 10 lines operate in Plovdiv.

Romania
In Romania, microbuze or maxi-taxi supplied the need of affordable public transportation in smaller towns when some local administrations abolished the expensive community-owned systems of buses. In Bucharest, this form of transportation appeared in the early 1980s, when the ITB began using them as a peak-hour service, beginning to use Irannational-made Mercedes-Benz T2 vans, being supplemented in the late 1980s by Rocar-TV vans. In 1990, the newly founded RATB sold off its operations to private operators, who began using them in competition to the RATB. They enjoyed wide popularity, especially from 2003 to 2007, and from 2011 onwards, when the RATB lost the rights to operate suburban routes.  On the Black Sea shore, it is very common to travel from Constanţa or Mangalia to the resorts on minibuses (microbuze), especially in those resorts where the competing train service is far from the beach and/or lodging facilities. These minibuses have been criticised for their shady operations, lack of safety and primitive transportation conditions.

Asia-Pacific
Similar systems can be found in South East Asia, like the Philippines with minibuses called jeepneys and Thailand with minibuses called songthaew. 

In India, several cities have minibuses apart from the presence of three-wheeler taxi-cabs called rickshaws. Minibuses are especially popular in the city of Kolkata for intra-city travel but are also present elsewhere. It is also a crucial mode of public transport in the Himalayan region and in the hilly tracts of Northeast India, as other modes of transport are infrequent or absent altogether.

Africa
Some African countries have a similar system, with minibuses called matatu (Kenya), dala dala (Tanzania) or tro tro (Ghana).

See also
Share taxi
Pesero
Dollar van
Dolmuş
Minibuses in Hong Kong
Nanny van
Aluguer
Hail and ride
Songthaew

Notes

External links
Bus Transport database (united photo gallery). Database of bus transport (including marshrutkas) in cities around the world (including the cities of Russia) with an overview of the cities and models of buses. Includes photos of each instance indicating the route number, production year, year starts working on the line and the transport company.

Share taxis
Road transport in Belarus
Road transport in Russia
Road transport in Ukraine
Road transport in the Soviet Union
Types of bus service
Public transport